Hans Sluga (born 1939), a professor of philosophy
 Simon Sluga (born 1993), Croatian footballer
 Sluga, a 1989 Soviet film
 Slang term for a powerful baseball batter